The Nerlandsøy Bridge is a bridge that crosses the Søre Vaulen strait between the islands of Bergsøya and Nerlandsøya in the municipality of Herøy in Møre og Romsdal county, Norway.

It is just west of Fosnavåg and it is part of the bridge network that connects all of the main islands of Herøy.

See also
Remøy Bridge
Runde Bridge
Herøy Bridge
List of bridges in Norway
List of bridges in Norway by length
List of bridges
List of bridges by length

References

External links
Road Viaducts & Bridges in Norway

Sunnmøre
Bridges in Møre og Romsdal
Bridges completed in 1968